Thomas Ellsworth Morgan (October 13, 1906 – July 31, 1995) was a Democratic member of the U.S. House of Representatives from Pennsylvania.

Thomas E. Morgan was born in Ellsworth, Pennsylvania; his mother was an immigrant from England and his father was from Wales.  He graduated from Waynesburg College in 1930, the Detroit College of Medicine and Surgery in 1933, and Wayne University in Detroit, Michigan, in 1934.  He began the practice of medicine and surgery at Fredericktown, Pennsylvania, in 1935.

He was elected as a Democrat to the 79th and to the fifteen succeeding Congresses (January 3, 1945 – January 3, 1977).  He was the Chairman of the United States House Committee on Foreign Affairs (86th through 93rd Congresses), and the United States House Committee on International Relations during the 94th Congress.  He was not a candidate for reelection in 1976.

References

External links
 

1906 births
1995 deaths
American people of English descent
American people of Welsh descent
People from Washington County, Pennsylvania
Physicians from Pennsylvania
Wayne State University alumni
Waynesburg University alumni
Democratic Party members of the United States House of Representatives from Pennsylvania
20th-century American politicians